Yilan may refer to:

China
Yilan County, Heilongjiang (依兰县), county of central Heilongjiang province, People's Republic of China
Yilan Town, Heilongjiang (依兰镇), seat of Yilan County
Yilan, Jilin (依兰镇), town in Yanji

Taiwan
Yilan County, Taiwan (宜蘭縣), county in northeastern Taiwan
Yilan County Council
Yilan City (宜蘭市), seat of Yilan County
Yilan River (宜蘭河), river flowing through Yilan County

Turkey
Yılankale, crusader castle
Yılan Island, Mediterranean island in Turkey